...And the Circus Leaves Town is the fourth and final studio album by American stoner rock band Kyuss, released on July 11, 1995, nearly a year before their breakup. Drummer Alfredo Hernández (Yawning Man) replaces Brant Bjork, who left Kyuss in 1993. The album features a tighter and more straightforward sound, both in songwriting and production, than the band's preceding efforts. The album was not as commercially or critically successful as the previous Blues for the Red Sun and Welcome to Sky Valley. Critic Dean Brown attributes this partly to a lack of promotion and the band's breakup, but also notes that the album "deserves to be cherished as much as the two molten hot records that came right before it." A video was released for "One Inch Man", the album's only official single.

Reception 
The album received a positive review in Tharunka, an Australian student publication, in August 1995. The review described the lead single, "One Inch Man", as "unrepresentative" of the album's sound. Two of the tracks, "Jumbo Blimp Jumbo" and "Catamaran", were compared favorably to Black Sabbath and Sonic Youth respectively, and the reviewer noted, "What is admirable here too is singwriter/guitarist Josh's seeming ability to formulate brilliantly executed songs, despite the regular adoption of atypical song-writing structures."

Track listing 
Writing credits adapted from the album's liner notes.

Notes 

The song "Catamaran" is a cover of a song originally recorded by drummer Alfredo Hernández' previous band Yawning Man.
Hidden track "Day One" was originally released in Germany as part of the "Demon Cleaner" extended CD single under the title "Day One (To Dave and Krist)". It was dedicated to the remaining Nirvana members Dave Grohl and Krist Novoselic, after Kurt Cobain's suicide.
The song "Hurricane" is featured in the 2006 video game Need for Speed: Carbon. An early recording of the song, as well as "El Rodeo", was released on the "Demon Cleaner" single in 1994.

Personnel
Credits adapted from the album's liner notes.

Kyuss
 John Garcia – lead vocals, producer
 Josh Homme – guitar, producer
 Scott Reeder – bass, producer
 Alfredo Hernández – drums, producer

Production
 Chris Goss – producer
 Joe Barresi – recording engineer
 Brian Jenkins – mixing engineer
 Billy Bowers – assistant engineer
 Chad Banford – assistant engineer
 Eddy Schreyer – mastering engineer

Artwork
 Jill Jordan – painting
 Michael Anderson – photography

Charts

References 

1995 albums
Albums produced by Chris Goss
Albums recorded at Sound City Studios
Elektra Records albums
Kyuss albums